Mattanur Sankarankutty (M. P. Sankara Marar) is an Indian  percussionist who plays the chenda (a traditional Kerala drum), Thayambaka, Panchari melam, and Panchavadyam. He was born in Mattanur in Kannur district of Kerala. He was awarded the Kerala Sangeetha Nataka Akademi Award in 1996, the Padma Shri by the Government of India in 2009 and the Sangeet Natak Akademi Award in 2012.

Mattanur, as he is known, is married to Bharathi, a native of Tirur in Malappuram district. They have two sons, Mattannur Sreekanth and Mattannur Sreeraj. Both Sreekanth and Sreeraj are also popular Thayambaka artists.

See also 
Pallavur Appu Marar
Peruvanam Kuttan Marar
Kelath Aravindakshan Marar

References

Living people
Indian percussionists
Malayali people
People from Kannur district
Recipients of the Padma Shri in arts
Chenda players
Recipients of the Sangeet Natak Akademi Award
Musicians from Kerala
20th-century drummers
20th-century Indian musicians
21st-century Indian musicians
1954 births
Recipients of the Kerala Sangeetha Nataka Akademi Award